Vinichenko is a surname. Notable people with the surname include:

Igor Vinichenko (born 1984), Russian hammer thrower
Yakov Vinichenko (born 1925), Soviet World War II officer

See also
Vynnychenko

Slavic-language surnames